Wild Bulls and Horses is a collaborative studio album by ARIA Award winning artists and ARIA Hall of Fame inductees, Brian Cadd and Russell Morris. The album was released on 27 June 2011.

The songs were written and intended to go to Nashville for other performers to record but Cadd and Morris decided to record them themselves. The album was met with high acclaim.

Track listing

Release history

Credits
 Acoustic Guitar, Electric Guitar, Mandolin, Harmonica – John Beland
 Bass – James Gillard
 Drums, Percussion – Mick Skelton
 Mastered By – Rupert Coffey
 Mixed By – Jack Guy (tracks: 1, 2, 4, 11, 12), Sam Hannan (tracks: 3, 5 to 10, 13)
 Piano, Keyboards – Brian Cadd
 Recorded By [Drums And Bass] – Daniel Denholm

References

2011 albums
Russell Morris albums
Brian Cadd albums
Collaborative albums
Self-released albums